D'Margio Cameron Wright-Phillips (born 24 September 2001) is an English professional footballer who plays for Northampton Town on loan from Stoke City, as a right winger.

Early and personal life
Wright-Phillips was born and raised in Manchester and attended St Bede's College. His father is Shaun Wright-Phillips and his grandfather is Ian Wright. His uncle, Bradley Wright-Phillips, is also a professional footballer and the all-time top scorer for the New York Red Bulls.

Career

Early career
Wright-Phillips began his career with Manchester City. In February 2020 he moved on a loan to Blackburn Rovers until the end of the season, playing for Blackburn's youth team.

Stoke City
Wright-Phillips signed for Stoke City in February 2021. He scored on his debut for the club's under-23 team. He made his professional debut on 9 January 2022 in a 2–0 FA Cup victory over Leyton Orient, and his Football League debut a week later on 16 January, putting in a man of the match performance in the EFL Championship fixture against Hull City. He scored his first goal for Stoke on 22 January in a 3–2 defeat against Fulham. After breaking into the first-team, Wright-Phillips signed a new two-and-a-half year contract. He signed an improved contract in July 2022, reflecting his first-team status.

On 31 January 2023, Wright-Phillips joined League Two side Northampton Town on loan for the remainder of the 2022–23 season.

International career
In August 2017 Wright-Phillips represented the England under-17 team.

Career statistics

References

2001 births
Living people
English footballers
Manchester City F.C. players
Blackburn Rovers F.C. players
Stoke City F.C. players
Northampton Town F.C. players
Association football wingers
Footballers from Manchester
Black British sportspeople
English Football League players
England youth international footballers
D'Margio